Forest Research Centre for Eco-Rehabilitation (FRCER) Prayagraj (Allahabad) was established in 1992 as an advanced centre under the umbrella of ICFRE, Dehradun. The centre aims to nurture and cultivate professional excellence in the field of social forestry and eco-rehabilitation in Eastern Uttar Pradesh, North Bihar and Vindhyan Region of Uttar Pradesh and Madhya Pradesh.

Research activities
 Planting Stock Improvement Programme (PSIP) 
 Wasteland reclamation
 Development of Agro-forestry Models
 Reclamation of mined areas through afforestation 
 Productivity of Ecosystem
 Studies on Shisham mortality

See also
 Indian Council of Forestry Research and Education
 Van Vigyan Kendra (VVK) Forest Science Centres

References

Indian forest research institutes
Indian Council of Forestry Research and Education
Ministry of Environment, Forest and Climate Change
Research institutes in Uttar Pradesh
Education in Allahabad
Organisations based in Allahabad
1992 establishments in Uttar Pradesh
Research institutes established in 1992